The Valley of the Queens is a site in Egypt, where the wives of pharaohs were buried in ancient times. It was known then as Ta-Set-Neferu, meaning "the place of beauty". It was most famous for being the burial site of many wives of Pharaohs. Pharaohs themselves were buried in the Valley of the Kings.

Using the limits described by Christian Leblanc, the Valley of the Queens consists of the main wadi, which contains most of the tombs, along with the Valley of Prince Ahmose, the Valley of the Rope, the Valley of the Three Pits, and the Valley of the Dolmen. The main wadi contains 91 tombs and the subsidiary valleys add another 19 tombs. The burials in the subsidiary valleys all date to the 18th Dynasty.

The reason for choosing the Valley of the Queens as a burial site is not known. The close proximity to the workers' village of Deir el-Medina and the Valley of the Kings may have been a factor. Another consideration could have been the existence of a sacred grotto dedicated to Hathor at the entrance of the Valley. This grotto may have been associated with rejuvenation of the dead.

Along with the Valley of the Kings and nearby Thebes, the Valley of the Queens was inscribed on the UNESCO World Heritage List in 1979.

Eighteenth Dynasty
One of the first tombs constructed in the Valley of the Queens is the tomb of Princess Ahmose, a daughter of Seqenenre Tao and Queen Sitdjehuti. This tomb likely dates to the reign of Thutmose I. The tombs from this period also include several members of the nobility, including a head of the stables and a vizier.

The tombs from the Valley of the Three Pits  mostly date to the Thutmosid period. The tombs are labeled with letters A - L. This valley also contains three shaft tombs, which are the origin of the valley's name. The modern labels for these three tombs are QV 89, QV 90, and QV 91.

The Valley of the Dolmen contains an old trail used by the workmen traveling from Deir el-Medina to the Valley of the Queens. Along this path is a small rock-cut temple dedicated to Ptah and Meretseger.

The tombs from this time period are generally simple in form and consist of a chamber and a shaft for burial. Some of the tombs were extended in size to accommodate more than one burial. The tombs include those of several royal princes and princesses, as well as some nobles.

A tomb of the Princesses was located in the Valley. This tomb dates to the time of Amenhotep III. Its location is currently unknown, but finds from the tomb are in museums and include fragments of burial equipment for several members of the royal family. The items include a canopic jar fragment of the King's Wife Henut. She is thought to have lived mid-18th Dynasty. Her name was enclosed in a cartouche. Canopic jar fragments mentioning Prince Menkheperre, a son of Tuthmosis III and Merytre Hatshepsut, were found. A King's Great Wife Nebetnehat from the mid-18th Dynasty is attested because her name was enclosed in a cartouche on canopic fragments.  Canopic jar fragments with the name of the King's Daughter Ti from the mid-18th Dynasty were found as well.

Nineteenth Dynasty

During the 19th Dynasty the use of the Valley became more selective. The tombs from this period belong exclusively to royal women. Many of the high-ranking wives of Ramesses I, Seti I and Ramesses II were buried in the Valley. One of the most well-known examples is the resting place carved out of the rock for Queen Nefertari (1290–1224 BCE). The polychrome reliefs in her tomb are still intact. Other members of the royal family continued to be buried in the Valley of the Kings. Tomb KV5, the tomb of the sons of Ramesses II, is an example of this practice.

The tomb of Queen Satre (QV 38) was likely the first tomb prepared during this dynasty. It was probably started during the reign of Ramesses I and finished during the reign of Seti I. Several tombs were prepared without an owner in mind, and the names were included upon the death of the royal female.

Twentieth Dynasty
During the beginning of the 20th Dynasty the Valley was still used extensively. Tombs for the wives of Ramesses III were prepared, and in a departure from the conventions of the previous dynasty, several tombs were prepared for royal sons as well. The construction of tombs continued at least until the reign of Ramesses VI. The Turin Papyrus mentions the creation of six tombs during the reign of Ramesses VI. It is not known which tombs are referred to in that papyrus.

There is evidence of economic turmoil during the 20th Dynasty. Records show that the workers went on strike during the reign of Ramesses III. And towards the end of the dynasty there are reports of tomb robberies.

Third Intermediate Period and later
The Valley was no longer a royal burial site after the close of the 20th Dynasty. Many of the tombs were extensively reused. Several tombs were modified so that they could hold multiple burials. In some cases this involved digging burial pits in the existing tombs. Not much is known about the use of the Valley of the Queens during the Ptolemaic Period but during the Roman Period there was a renewed, extensive use of the Valley as a burial site. During the Coptic Period some Hermit shelters were erected. Tombs QV60 (Nebettawy) and QV73 (Henuttawy) show signs of Coptic occupation. Wall scenes were covered with plaster and decorated with Christian symbols. The Christian presence lasted until the 7th century CE.

Principal burials

References

Bibliography

Sources

External links

 
 

 
Luxor
Valleys of Egypt
Tourist attractions in Egypt